Dana Latham (July 7, 1898 – February 6, 1974) was an American attorney who served as the Commissioner of Internal Revenue from 1958 to 1961.  He and Paul Watkins founded Latham & Watkins.  On March 22, 1959, Latham appeared on the television show What's My Line?

He died of a heart attack on February 6, 1974, in Los Angeles, California at age 75.

References

1898 births
1974 deaths
Commissioners of Internal Revenue
California Republicans
Ohio Wesleyan University alumni
Harvard Law School alumni